The 1911 Trinity Bantams football team represented the Trinity College during the 1911 college football season. The team upset Colgate.

Schedule

References

Trinity
Trinity Bantams football seasons
College football undefeated seasons
Trinity Bantams football